The Ras Al Khaimah Championship is a professional golf tournament held at Al Hamra Golf Club, in Ras Al Khaimah, United Arab Emirates. In 2021, the presenting sponsor was Phoenix Capital.

The event is played at the same venue which hosted the Ras Al Khaimah Golf Challenge in 2016 and 2017 on the Challenge Tour, as well as the Ras Al Khaimah Challenge Tour Grand Final in 2018.

Nicolai Højgaard won the inaugural event, beating Jordan Smith by four shots.

Winners

References

External links
Coverage on European Tour official site

European Tour events
Golf tournaments in the United Arab Emirates
Sports competitions in Dubai